Nizhnyaya is a rural locality (a village) in Yayvinskoye Urban Settlement, Alexandrovsky District, Perm Krai, Russia. The population was 3 as of 2010.

Geography 
It is located on the Yayva River.

References 

Rural localities in Alexandrovsky District